The Federal Correctional Institution, Lompoc (FCI Lompoc) is a low-security United States federal prison for male inmates in Lompoc, California. It is part of the Lompoc Federal Correctional Complex (FCC Lompoc) and is operated by the Federal Bureau of Prisons, a division of the United States Department of Justice.

The complex also includes a U.S. Penitentiary and a minimum-security prison camp.

Facility
The average offender at FCI Lompoc is serving between one and fifteen years for federal drug and or other non-violent offenses. It has four general housing units, two of which offer dormitory and room-type housing. The institution offers a full range of inmate employment, vocational training, education, counseling (both mental health and drug abuse), medical, dental, pre-release preparation, and other self-improvement opportunities.

Notable incidents

1980 escape
In the late evening hours of January 21, 1980, Christopher Boyce, who was serving a forty-year sentence for spying for the Soviet Union, escaped from FCI Lompoc. With the assistance of fellow inmates, he hid in a drainage hole, used a makeshift ladder and small tin scissors to cut through a barbed wire perimeter. Boyce was on the run for nineteen months, until U.S. Marshals and FBI Agents captured him on the Olympic Peninsula of western Washington at Port Angeles on August 21, 1981, ending one of the most extensive and complex manhunts in the history of the U.S. Marshals Service.

COVID-19 pandemic

A deadly COVID-19 outbreak swept through the federal correctional complex in 2020. It included several dozen staff members, including guards.

Notable inmates (current)

Notable inmates (former)
†Inmates who were released from custody prior to 1982 are not listed on the Bureau of Prisons website.

See also
List of U.S. federal prisons
Federal Bureau of Prisons
Incarceration in the United States

References

External links
Lompoc Federal Correctional Complex

Lompoc
Lompoc
Buildings and structures in Santa Barbara County, California
Lompoc, California